David Eric Edmunds is a British mathematician working in analysis.

He obtained his PhD in 1955 at the University of Cardiff under the supervision of Rosa M. Morris.

In 1996, he was awarded the Pólya Prize of the London Mathematical Society.

John M. Ball was one of his PhD students.

References

External links
 http://www.sussex.ac.uk/profiles/799 - Website at the University of Sussex
 

British mathematicians
Alumni of Cardiff University
Academics of the University of Sussex
Living people
Year of birth missing (living people)